Bloodworth is an English surname derived from Blidworth in Nottinghamshire. Notable people with the surname include:

 Dominique Bloodworth (born 1995), Dutch women's association football player
 Ethan James-Lee Bloodworth (born 1989), American homicide detective
 James Bloodworth Jr. (1925–2006), American physician and pathologist
 Jimmy Bloodworth (1917–2002), American baseball player
 Margaret Bloodworth (born 1949), former Canadian National Security Advisor
 Rhoda Bloodworth (1889–1980), New Zealand labour activist, community worker and feminist
 Sandra Bloodworth, Australian labour historian and socialist activist
 Sir Thomas Bloodworth (1620–1682), English merchant and politician; Lord Mayor of London during the Great Fire of London (1666)
 Tom Bloodworth (1882–1974), New Zealand politician
 Timothy Bloodworth (1736–1814), American teacher and statesman from North Carolina
 Linda Bloodworth-Thomason (born 1947), American writer and television producer
Byron Bloodworth Georgia MMA Hall of Fame
 Raymond Bloodworth, American composer often associated with L. Russell Brown and Bob Crewe

See also
 James Bloodsworth otherwise Bloodworth (1759–1804), English convict transported to Australia, builder
 SS Timothy Bloodworth, standard Liberty ship built for the United States Maritime Commission during World War II

References

English-language surnames